Wang Yuchen (born 5 August 1997 in Henan) is a Chinese former professional snooker player.

Career
Wang Yuchen first drew international attention in September 2013 at the 2013 Shanghai Masters when competing as a wildcard he defeated Joe Perry to reach the last 32 of the tournament where he eventually lost to 3–5 Neil Robertson.

In March 2016, Wang won the Asian Under-21 Snooker Championship, beating former professional Ratchayothin Yotharuck of Thailand 6–5 in the final. This win earned him a two-year professional card for the 2016–17 and 2017–18 seasons. He secured a 6–5 victory over 2002 world champion Peter Ebdon in the opening round of the 2016 UK Championship, before losing 6–5 to Liam Highfield after having led 4–1. Wang also won a match at the Welsh Open by edging past Gareth Allen 4–3, but lost 4–2 to Stuart Carrington in the second round.

Performance and rankings timeline

Career finals

Amateur finals: 1 (1 title)

References

External links

 Wang Yuchen at CueTracker.net: Snooker Results and Statistic Database

1997 births
Chinese snooker players
Living people
Sportspeople from Henan
21st-century Chinese people